The 1989 Heinz Southern 500, the 40th running of the event, was a NASCAR Winston Cup Series race held on September 3, 1989 at Darlington Raceway in Darlington, South Carolina.

Summary
Contested over 367 laps on the 1.366 mile (2.198 km) speedway, it was the 21st race of the 1989 NASCAR Winston Cup Series season. Dale Earnhardt of Richard Childress Racing won the race.

James Hylton blew his vehicle's engine on lap 13. Greg Sacks inflicted terminal vehicle damage on lap 20 while Jimmy Spencer did the identical thing on lap 80. J.D. McDuffie's vehicle had engine problems on lap 90 followed by Richard Petty on lap 91. Terry Labonte's vehicle would have a non-functioning engine on lap 167 while Alan Kulwicki's engine stopped working on lap 184.

John McFadden's vehicle gave off some nasty vibrations; forcing him off the track on lap 221 while water pump issues would relegate Joe Ruttman to the sidelines on lap 224. The engine on Larry Pearson's vehicle stopped functioning on lap 225 while Dave Marcis did terminal vehicle damage on lap 286. The last DNF of the race would involve Jimmy Means blowing up his vehicle's engine on lap 309.

Darrell Waltrip's chances at winning the Winston Million went south when he hit the wall.

Top ten results

Race statistics
 Time of race: 3:42:03
 Average Speed: 
 Pole Speed: 
 Cautions: 4 for 24 laps
 Margin of Victory: 1.5 sec
 Lead changes: 26
 Percent of race run under caution: 6.5%         
 Average green flag run: 68.6 laps

References

Heinz Southern 500
Heinz Southern 500
Heinz Southern 500
NASCAR races at Darlington Raceway